is a Japanese chemist working in the field of coordination chemistry, with specific focus on the chemistry of organic–inorganic hybrid compounds, as well as chemical and physical properties of porous coordination polymers and metal-organic frameworks in particular. He is currently Distinguished Professor at Kyoto University's institute for Integrated Cell-Material Sciences (iCeMS), of which he is co-founder and current director.

Life
From 1975 to 1979, Kitagawa pursued and obtained a PhD degree in hydrocarbon chemistry, at Kyoto University, where he had previously done his undergraduate studies. He was appointed in 1979 at Kindai University as Assistant Professor, promoted first to Lecturer in 1983, and in 1988 to Associate Professor. In 1992, he became Professor of Inorganic Chemistry at Tokyo Metropolitan University and in 1998 Professor of Inorganic Functional Chemistry at the University of Kyoto, in the department of Synthetic Chemistry and Biological Chemistry. In 2007 he co-founded Institute for Integrated Cell–Material Sciences, and was named Deputy Director. Since 2013 he is the Director of the Institute.

In addition to his academic positions in Japan, he was guest professor at Texas A&M University in 1986–1987, and at the City University of New York in 1996.

In 2011 he became a member of the Science Council of Japan.

Awards
2003 – Creative Society of Japan (CSJ) Prize for Creative Work
2008 – Humboldt Research Prize
2009 – Chemical Society of Japan Award
2010 – Thomson Reuters Citation Laureates
2011 – Medal with Purple Ribbon
2013 – De Gennes Prize
2016 – Japan Academy Prize (academics)
2016 – Fred Basolo Medal, Northwestern University, USA
2017 – Chemistry for the future Solvay Prize
2017 – Fujihara Award
2019 – Grand Prix de la Fondation de la Maison de la Chimie
2019 – Emanuel Merck Lectureship

Bibliography

Professor Kitagawa has published more than 600 research articles in international journals, and these papers are cited more than 25,000 times (as of October 2017). His most cited works include:

 in 1997, a seminal report on a porous coordination polymer (MOF) for small molecule adsorption
 in 2004, an early review of functional porous coordination polymers
 in 2005, a study of dynamic properties of porous coordination polymers based on hydrogen bonds
 in 2009, a review of “soft porous crystals”, which feature large-scale structural transformability upon chemical or physical stimulation

References

Japanese chemists
Academic staff of Kyoto University
1951 births
Living people